Deh Shib (also Romanized as Deh Shīb; also known as Deh-e Shīb) is a village in Farmeshkhan Rural District, in the Central District of Kavar County, Fars Province, Iran. At the 2006 census, its population was 1,159, in 279 families.

References 

Populated places in Kavar County